Brushwood is a  rural community in the central east part of the Riverina region of New South Wales, Australia.

Brushwood lies within the wheat farming belt of the Coolamon Shire Council and is the home of a small railway station (for the uploading of wheat and other grains) and a series of large  silos.

References

External links

Towns in the Riverina
Towns in New South Wales
Coolamon Shire